The 1886 Alabama gubernatorial election took place on August 2, 1886, in order to elect the governor of Alabama.

Results

References

1886
gubernatorial
Alabama
August 1886 events